This article displays the rosters for the teams competing at the 2015 Women's EuroHockey Nations Championship. Each team had to submit 18 players.

Pool A

Netherlands
Head Coach: Sjoerd Marijne

Belgium
Head Coach: Pascal Kina

Spain
Head Coach: Adrian Lock

Poland
Head Coach: Krzysztof Rachwalski

Pool B

England
Head Coach: Danny Kerry

Germany
Head Coach: Jamilon Mülders

Scotland
Head Coach: Gordon Shepherd

Italy
Head Coach: Fernando Ferrara

References

Women's EuroHockey Nations Championship squads
squads